Satan's Circus is the fourth studio album by Death in Vegas, released on 11 October 2004 on Drone Records in the United Kingdom and on 24 May 2005 on Sanctuary Records in the United States. Contrary to previous releases, this album features no guest vocalists. This album is the first release through Death in Vegas's own label, Drone Records. It peaked at #79 on the French Albums Chart.

Track listing
 ""
 "Zugaga"
 "Heil Xanax"
 "Black Lead"
 "Sons of Rother"
 "Candy McKenzie"
 "Reigen"
 "Kontroll"
 "Anita Berber"
 "Head"
 "Come on Over to Our Side, Softly Softly"

Bonus disc (Live at Brixton)
Satan's Circus also contained the Live at Brixton bonus disc, recorded during the performance at Brixton Academy in May 2003.

 "Natja"
 "Leather"
 "Girls"
 "Death Threat"
 "Rekkit"
 "Blood Yawning"
 "23 Lies"
 "Flying"
 "Dirge"
 "Help Yourself"
 "Scorpio Rising"
 "Hands Around My Throat"

Singles
 "" (vinyl only, 13 September 2004)
 "Head" (vinyl only, 4 October 2004)

Personnel

Death in Vegas
 Richard Fearless - production, keyboards, programming
 Tim Holmes - production, keyboards, programming
 Terry Miles - production, keyboards, engineering

Additional musicians
 Ian Button – guitar
 Danny Hammond - guitar  (tracks: 5, 9, 10)
 Will Blanchard - drums (track 1)
 Simon Hanson - drums (track: 10)
 Susan Delane - vocals on "Heil Xanax"

References

External links
 

2004 albums
Death in Vegas albums